Sam Rajabi (born 21 March 1985) is an Iranian former judoka. He competed in 2007 World Judo Championships for Iran and also won the bronze medal in the heavyweight (+100 kg) division at the 2009 Asian Judo Championships. Rajabi also has competed in jiu-jitsu world championships and won a gold medal in 2020. He moved to the United States in 2011.

Human right activities
On 28 December 2019, Ehsan Rajabi went on podium to receive his gold medal at the World Jiu-Jitsu Championships in Orlando, US, holding a shirt with Navid Afkari's picture on it. He was a member of the "Unity for Navid" campaign and wrote on his Twitter page:

"Today I fought for Navid as a member of the campaign #Unity_for_Navid and became the champion of the world. The path of Navid continues. Promises [Navids] sprout and grow until the day of freedom. We athletes will continue in his footsteps."

References

1985 births
Living people
Iranian male judoka
20th-century Iranian people
21st-century Iranian people